I'm Alright is a studio album by American country artist Lynn Anderson. It was released in September 1970 on Chart Records and was produced by Slim Williamson. I'm Alright was Anderson's tenth studio recording and her final studio release for the Chart label. It included two singles that became major radio hits in 1970. Both "Rocky Top" and the title track reached the Billboard country charts that year.

Background and content
I'm Alright was recorded in November 1969 at the RCA Victor Studio in Nashville, Tennessee. The sessions were produced by Slim Williamson, who was Anderson's long time record producer at the Chart label. The record consisted of ten tracks. The album's final track, "If the Creeks Don't Rise," was composed by Anderson's mother Liz Anderson. It also included a composition by Joe South called "Down in the Boondocks." The latter composition was first a hit by Billy Joe Royal. The album also included cover versions of Georgia Gibbs's "Seven Lonely Days" and Glen Campbell's "Try a Little Kindness." The album's title track was an original recording composed by Bill Anderson. He also wrote the album's liner notes.

Release and reception

I'm Alright was released in September 1970 on Chart Records. It was her tenth album recording and her final studio record issued on the Chart label. The project was issued as a vinyl LP, with five songs featured on each side of the record. I'm Alright charted on the Billboard Top Country Albums survey upon its release. In November 1970, it reached a peak position of 33 on the chart. The album was reviewed positively by Billboard as well. The writers praised Anderson's cover versions included on the album as well as the original compositions. "The top stylist offers another fine package of strong material," they wrote.

The first single release from the project was Anderson's cover of "Rocky Top" in April 1969. The song became a major hit on the Billboard Hot Country Singles chart that year after reaching the top 20. It eventually peaked at number 17. The title track was spawned as the album's second single in October 1970. The song reached number 20 on the Billboard country songs chart after 11 weeks on the list. In addition, both singles reached top 40 positions on the Canadian RPM Country Singles chart.

Track listing

Personnel
All credits are adapted from the liner notes of I'm Alright.

Musical and technical personnel
 Bill Anderson – liner notes
 Lynn Anderson – lead vocals
 Don Quest – cover photo and design
 Slim Williamson – producer

Chart performance

Release history

References

1970 albums
Albums produced by Slim Williamson
Chart Records albums
Lynn Anderson albums